Matthias Braunöder (born 27 March 2002) is an Austrian professional footballer who plays as a midfielder for Austria Wien.

Career
Braunöder is a youth product of SV Sigleß, before joining Austria Wien's youth academy in 2011. In 2019, he started training with Austria Wien's reserves. He signed a professional contract with the club on 3 June 2019. He made his professional debut with Austria Wien in a 4–0 Austrian Football Bundesliga win over Admira Wacker on 26 January 2021. He was named the inaugural winner for the "Newcomer of the Season" award for the 2021–22 Austrian Football Bundesliga season.

International career
Braunöder is a youth international for Austria, having represented them at various levels from U15 to U21. He captained the Austria U17s at the 2019 UEFA European Under-17 Championship.

Personal life
Braunöder's father, Markus, was also a professional footballer in Austria.

References

External links
 
 OEFB Profile

2002 births
Living people
People from Eisenstadt
Footballers from Burgenland
Austrian footballers
Austria under-21 international footballers
Austria youth international footballers
FK Austria Wien players
Austrian Football Bundesliga players
2. Liga (Austria) players
Association football midfielders